Boughton Aluph (pronounced Bawton Alluf) is a village and civil parish in the Borough of Ashford in Kent, England, and is about 5 miles (8 km) north of Ashford on the A251 road. There are two villages within the parish: Boughton Aluph itself, and Boughton Lees. Boughton Corner is a small hamlet within the parish, further east on the A28 road.

The civil parish shares its council with the smaller locality of Eastwell.

The place-name 'Boughton Aluph' is first attested as 'Boltune' in the Domesday Book of 1086, as 'Boctune' in the related Domesday Monachorum, and as 'Botun Alou' in the Close Rolls of 1237. 'Boughton' means 'town or settlement where beeches grew'; the village was held by one Alulf in 1211-12, the name being a variant of the Old German 'Adalulf'.

Amenities
There are three places of worship:
All Saints' Church
Saint Christopher's Church (in Boughton Lees)
Boughton Baptist chapel.

Notable residents
Alfred Deller, CBE (1912–1979), professional singer and countertenor.  He is also buried in the churchyard.
Rear Admiral Derek Anthony MBE
Matthew King (composer)

References

External links

 Notes on the parish
 All Saints' church
 Neighbourhood Plan for the Parish of Boughton Aluph and Eastwell

Villages in Kent
Civil parishes in Kent
Borough of Ashford